Julio Raúl González Pérez (born 23 October 1952), known as Raúl González, is a Spanish football manager.

External links

Soccerway profile

1952 births
Living people
People from Avilés
Spanish football managers
CD Ensidesa managers
Real Avilés CF managers
Zamora CF managers
Equatorial Guinea national football team managers
Villarreal CF managers
SD Ponferradina managers
Pontevedra CF managers
AD Alcorcón managers
Burgos CF managers
Real Oviedo managers